Udarata Rulers (formerly known as Kandurata Maroons) is a franchise cricket team that takes part in the Super 4's T20 tournament which is a temporary installment of the Sri Lanka Premier League. The captain is Lahiru Thirimanne, the head coach is former fast bowler Chaminda Vaas. The team won the 2013 Super 4's tournament and qualified for the 2013 Champions League Twenty20.

Squad
Players with international caps are listed in bold.

Source(s): Cricinfo, Kandurata Maroons

References

See also
2013 Champions League Twenty20

Sri Lanka Premier League teams